Ignacio Ventura Figueredo (July 31, 1899, in Algarrobito, Apure – September 3, 1995, in San Fernando de Apure), was a Venezuelan folk musician and harpist.

See also 

International Jose Guillermo Carrillo Foundation
Venezuela
Venezuelan music

1899 births
1995 deaths
Venezuelan composers
Male composers
Venezuelan folk harpists
Venezuelan folk musicians
20th-century composers
20th-century male musicians